Yashwant or Yashawant is a given name.

People 
Yashwant Vithoba Chittal (born 1928), Kannada fiction writer, Academy Award recipient for his work Purusottama
 Yashwant Jadhav, Indian politician
Yashwant Singh Parmar (1906–1981), Indian politician and Chief Minister of Himachal Pradesh
Yashwant Sardeshpande, theatre actor, director, playwright
Yashwant Singh (Lok Sabha member), Indian politician
Yashwant Sinha (born 1937), Indian politician
 Yashwant Trivedi, Indian Gujarati poet, essayist and critic
 Yashwant Vyas, Indian author, journalist and editor
 Yashwant Dev (1926 – 2018), Indian Marathi poet
 Yashwantrao Chavan, Indian politician
 Yashwantrao Holkar, Indian king
Prakash Yashwant Ambedkar, national president of the Bharipa Bahujan Mahasangh Indian political party

Other 
 Yashwant Sagar, a dam reservoir in India 
 Yashwant Stadium